1,2,4-Butanetriol trinitrate (BTTN), also called butanetriol trinitrate, is an important military propellant. It is a colorless to brown explosive liquid.

BTTN is used as a propellant in virtually all single-stage missiles used by the United States, including the Hellfire. It is less volatile, less sensitive to shock, and more thermally stable than nitroglycerine, for which it is a promising replacement.

BTTN as a propellant is often used in a mixture with nitroglycerin. The mixture can be made by co-nitration of butanetriol and glycerol. BTTN is also used as a plasticizer in some nitrocellulose-based propellants.

BTTN is manufactured by nitration of 1,2,4-butanetriol. Biotechnological manufacture of butanetriol is under intensive research.

References

External links
 WebBook page for 1,2,4-Butanetriol, trinitrate

Nitrate esters
Explosive chemicals
Liquid explosives
Propellants